is a Japanese anime series produced by Actas, directed by Susumu Tosaka and written by Keigo Koyanagi, featuring character designs by Kimitake Nishio based on QP:flapper's original designs. It premiered on 7 July 2016. Infinite and Bandai Namco Entertainment are part of the production committee.

Plot
12 years ago, in the country of Rimgarde, a big incident left an unsolved mystery that has begun to fade from people's memories. Time passes, and Sisters Yui and Rena live a peaceful life in the Enastoria Empire, but they become involved in a vortex of destiny when a giant robot attacks Enastoria.

Characters

Main characters

The main protagonist, and the Empress of Enastoria. She is called Yui by her friends.

 / 

Yui's adoptive big sister and Regalia. She was only one found after the fall of Rimgarde. After being recovered and waking up in home of Asteria family's home and they took her in. Regardless that she has long since stopped aging, after their parents died and Yui forced to become the empress since she is pure-blood, the latter went through all grades of school and forced herself to mature in order to support Yui, and pretended she was merely petite.

Tia's sister and Regalia

 / 

Sara's sister

The princess of Rimgarde. Her country was destroyed by the Lux ex Machina and she had been seeking to bring the one responsible for her country's destruction to justice.

 / 

Ingrid's adoptive sister and Regalia. She was found all alone and abandoned by Ingrid, and since then she became close to Ingrid.

Enastoria Empire

Yui’s Advisor 

 Prime Minister of Enastoria 

Yui's mother.

Republic of Afmaraldo

She is engaged to the Regalia Lowe whom she is bound to.

Others

 Yui’s best friend. Yui calls her Retty. 

A scientist from Rimgarde and main antagonist of the series.

Head of Rimgarde Military. Used to be a military ambassador in Enastoria. 

Tia and Sarah’s big sister 

The creator of the Regalias.

Mecha

Regalia

Erinius

The combat Regalia used by Yui and Magna. Powers include high jumping, an energy right arm that forms shockwaves by punching the ground, charging the left arm with fire, martial arts, charging its hands with electricity and insert red explosive pillars, orange energy beams from soles during flying kicks, forming a dark dome that absorbs matter and emits lightning, a round shield stored on back that can divide into two, five blue crystal spears from the right arm, twin back tendrils, blue flames from the claws, rocket propelling in the elbows, and regeneration by liquid darkness.

The combat Regalia used by Aurea and Sara. Powers include a blue energy blade stored in left hip that can charge with lightning for more damage, a crystal sword in right wrist shield that turns objects to ice, high jumping, a snake sword that can form pink lasers and cyclones by spinning fast enough, agility, pink crystal blades in each segment of the snake sword, combining both sword to form a drill-like rocket propelled spear, and erecting a sphered barrier composed of wind.

The combat Regalia used by Ingrid and Xeno. Powers include flight, lances stored in each shoulder that can combine at the butt, a green energy blaster in each shoulder that can charge up for more damage, a machine gun stored in each shoulder, shockwaves from the lances when combined, flying green laser guns, a pair of pendulum bladed staffs in each shoulder, and eight green lasers from each wing.

The combined form of the three combat Regalias after Lux grants its pilots the keys necessary for fusion that only appears in episode 13. Powers include flight, green energy cutters from the wrists, and spawning gauntlets of gold that emit green crystals for impalement.

Enki

An old Regalia engaged with Ryu that only appeared in episode 6. Its only known power is spawning water which allowed it to create an oasis in a desert after many years and serves as a resting place for dying Regalias.

Others

The ancient Regalia used by Johann to command the orbital elevator Lux Exmachina. In form 1 powers include flight, four retractable arms with a pink laser cannon in each palm, a circular energy barrier, palm energy spheres that fire purple lasers, and a red torso energy cannon. In form 2 Powers include energy fists from the back halo, levitation, teleportation, spawning a ring of humanoid missiles, and turning the back halo into gauntlets.

Regalia Gear

Edmond's Regalia Gear that appears in episode 1. Powers include a wrecking ball stored in each shoulder, hidden spikes in the wrecking balls, and charging its wrecking balls with electricity.

Johnny's Regalia Gear that appears in episodes 2 and 3. Powers include razor cards spawned from the hands, giant cards capable of teleporting and turning into glass cases, white balls that form fire birds, agility, smokescreen trap doors, agility, a crook, bomb summoning, and a left arm cape with red energy barrier.

Abel's Regalia Gear that appears in episodes 4 and 5. Powers include super speed, a blade on each wrist, a zweihander stored on the back with an orange laser gun in the blade, and a second green blade in the zweihander that is rocket propelled.

Johann's Regalia Gear that appears in episodes 6, 7, and 8. Powers include flight, transforming into a jet, dozens of flying arrowheads that fire pink lasers, twin chainsaws on each wrist that act as pincer claws, dual back scythes, electric blasts from the hands, red energy cannon from torso that rivals napalm, reformation, and dual torso sonic tendrils.

Noa's Regalia Gear that appears in episodes 9, 10, 11, 12, and 13. Powers include opening wormholes, teleportation, strength, levitation, blue energy cannon in the knuckles, and commanding both Centurios.

Two unmanned Regalia Gears that appear in episodes 9, 10, 11, and 12. Powers include teleportation, a red energy ball cannon, a shield that redirects energy attacks, and levitation.

Media

Anime
An anime television series animated by studio Actas, began airing on 7 July 2016 premiering on AT-X & Tokyo MX with later broadcasts on Sun TV and BS Fuji. The opening theme "Divine Spell" is sung by TRUE, while the ending theme "Patria" is sung by Minami. The anime has been licensed by Funimation and by Madman Entertainment for streaming. After the broadcast of episode 4, the series' television broadcast has been halted until September 2016 to allow more time for quality improvements. The series restarted its broadcast from the beginning on 1 September 2016. The anime was released across six Blu-ray & DVD volumes.

Episode list

Notes

References

External links
Official website 

Actas
Anime with original screenplays
Funimation
Mecha anime and manga